Orthaga bipartalis is a species of snout moth in the genus Orthaga. It is known from Singapore.

References

Moths described in 1906
Epipaschiinae
Endemic fauna of Singapore
Moths of Singapore